Skulte is a village in Limbaži Municipality, Latvia, and the centre of Skulte Parish.

Towns and villages in Latvia
Limbaži Municipality